This article is about the particular significance of the year 1885 to Wales and its people.

Incumbents
Lord Lieutenant of Anglesey – Richard Davies 
Lord Lieutenant of Brecknockshire – Joseph Bailey, 1st Baron Glanusk
Lord Lieutenant of Caernarvonshire – Edward Douglas-Pennant, 1st Baron Penrhyn
Lord Lieutenant of Cardiganshire – Edward Pryse
Lord Lieutenant of Carmarthenshire – John Campbell, 2nd Earl Cawdor
Lord Lieutenant of Denbighshire – William Cornwallis-West    
Lord Lieutenant of Flintshire – Hugh Robert Hughes 
Lord Lieutenant of Glamorgan – Christopher Rice Mansel Talbot 
Lord Lieutenant of Merionethshire – Robert Davies Pryce 
Lord Lieutenant of Monmouthshire – Henry Somerset, 8th Duke of Beaufort
Lord Lieutenant of Montgomeryshire – Edward Herbert, 3rd Earl of Powis
Lord Lieutenant of Pembrokeshire – William Edwardes, 4th Baron Kensington
Lord Lieutenant of Radnorshire – Arthur Walsh, 2nd Baron Ormathwaite

Bishop of Bangor – James Colquhoun Campbell 
Bishop of Llandaff – Richard Lewis
Bishop of St Asaph – Joshua Hughes
Bishop of St Davids – Basil Jones

Archdruid of the National Eisteddfod of Wales – Clwydfardd

Events
October – Keswick House, predecessor of Aberdare Hall, in Cardiff opens, allowing women to study for degrees through the University College of South Wales and Monmouthshire.
24 November – The United Kingdom general election is the first in which the Liberal Party has a candidate in every Welsh constituency. The Liberals win 30 of the 34 available seats.
23 December – 81 miners are killed in an accident at the Maerdy Colliery, Rhondda.
The world's first passenger-carrying ropeway comes into use over the River Aeron at Aberaeron.
Opening of steelworks at Brymbo.
By order of the Admiralty, only Welsh coal is to be used on ships of the Royal Navy.
Three people are killed when fire breaks out at the University of Wales, Aberystwyth.
Frances Hoggan is the first woman doctor registered in Wales.
Opening of the first local authority secondary school in Cardiff.
Under the Redistribution of Seats Act 1885, the constituencies of Denbighshire, Glamorganshire, North and South Monmouthshire are among those disestablished.

Arts and literature

Awards
National Eisteddfod of Wales  – held at Aberdare
Chair – Watkin Hezekiah Williams, "Y Gwir yn Erbyn y Byd"
Crown – Griffith Tecwyn Parry

New books
Daniel James (Gwyrosydd) – Caneuon Gwyrosydd
Daniel Owen – Hunangofiant Rhys Lewis, Gweinidog Bethel, the first long novel written in Welsh

Music
5 August – Queen Victoria's harpist John Thomas (Pencerdd Gwalia) marries a former student, Joan Francis Denny.

Sport
Football – Druids win the Welsh Cup for the fourth time in its eight-year history.
Golf – Course at Borth opens.
Rugby union
Cross Keys RFC, London Welsh RFC, Neyland RFC and Risca RFC are founded.
Arthur Gould plays his first international match for Wales.

Births
21 May – William Dowell, Welsh dual-code rugby player (died 1949)
26 June – David John Williams, writer and politician (died 1970)
2 August – Clarence Bruce, 3rd Baron Aberdare (died 1957)
5 September – Jenkin Alban Davies, Welsh international rugby captain (died 1976)
21 November –  Robert Evans, footballer (died 1965)
date unknown
Ernest Evans, politician (died 1965)
James Grey West, architect (died 1951, in Beer, Devon)

Deaths
21 January – John Gwyn Jeffreys, conchologist, 76
15 March – Jane Williams (Ysgafell), writer, 79
1 May – Henry Brinley Richards, composer, 67
10 May – Edward Stephen, composer, 62
27 July – Penry Williams, artist, 82
1 August – Sidney Gilchrist Thomas, metallurgist and inventor, 34
24 September – Samuel Roberts, political and economic writer, 85

References

 
Wales